Leroy Hornbeck (September 30, 1875 – October 16, 1964) was an American football coach.  Hornbeck was the head football coach at Kalamazoo College in Kalamazoo, Michigan.  He held that position for the 1902 season.  His coaching record at Kalamazoo 3–5–1.

References

1875 births
1964 deaths
19th-century players of American football
Kalamazoo Hornets football coaches
Kalamazoo Hornets football players
University of Chicago alumni
University of Michigan alumni